"Insatiable" is the debut solo single released by Australian singer Darren Hayes, former lead singer of Savage Garden. The song served as the lead single from his debut solo album, Spin (2002). It was first released to American adult contemporary radio on 7 January 2002 and was issued as a CD single in Australia on 14 January 2002. The song topped the New Zealand Singles Chart on the week of 21 April 2002, reached number three on the Australian and Danish singles charts, and peaked at number eight on the Swedish and UK singles charts.

Composition
"Insatiable" is in the key of G minor and is played at a tempo of 144 beats per minute.

Music video
The music video showcases Darren Hayes looking at videos of an actress that he is infatuated with. The video continues with Hayes showing he has allowed his hair to grow, and has dyed it blonde, which is his natural hair colour.

Hayes said in a HuffPost piece in 2022 that although US label executives were initially enthusiastic about the song itself, after they were shown a rough cut of the video, they feared Hayes appeared "too gay" for American audiences and wanted to "overhaul" his image "so as not to scare off fans".

Track listings

Australian and New Zealand CD single
 "Insatiable" (album version)
 "Ride" (original demo recording)
 "Falling at Your Feet" (original demo recording)

Australian and New Zealand CD single – Remixes
 "Insatiable" (album version)
 "Insatiable" (Calderone club mix)
 "Insatiable" (Pablo Larosa's Funktified mix)
 "Insatiable" (Specificus 'Insomniac' mix)
 "Insatiable" ('dp versus Darren Hayes' mix)
 "Insatiable" (Specificus 'Let It Go' mix)

European CD single
 "Insatiable" (album version) – 5:10
 "Falling at Your Feet" (original demo recording) – 4:59

UK CD1
 "Insatiable" (album version) – 5:10
 "Falling at Your Feet" (original demo recording) – 4:54
 "Insatiable" (Specificus 'Insomniac' mix) – 6:00
 "Insatiable" (video)

UK CD2
 "Insatiable" (album version) – 5:10
 "Ride" (original demo recording) – 4:46
 "Insatiable" (Calderone radio edit) – 6:30

Japanese CD single
 "Insatiable" (album version)
 "Insatiable" (Specificus 'Insomniac' mix)
 "Falling at Your Feet"

Credits and personnel
Credits are lifted from the Spin album booklet.

Studios
 Recorded and mixed at Wallyworld Studios (Marin County, California)
 Orchestra recorded at Ocean Way Recording (Los Angeles)
 Mastered at Gateway Mastering (Portland, Maine, US)

Personnel

 Darren Hayes – writing, lead and background vocals, co-production
 Walter Afanasieff – writing, keyboards, bass, drum and rhythm programming, production, arrangement
 Bruce Dukov – violin
 Eve Butler – violin
 Susan Chatman – violin
 Charlie Everett – violin
 Gerry Hilera – violin
 Norm Hughes – violin
 Peter Kent – violin
 Jennifer Munday – violin
 Bob Peterson – violin
 Michele Richards – violin
 Bob Sanov – violin
 Ed Stein – violin
 John Wittenberg – violin
 John Hayhurst – viola
 Karen Elaine – viola
 Virginia Frazier – viola
 Andrew Picken – viola
 Larry Corbett – cello
 Suzie Katayama – cello, orchestral contracting
 Paula Hochhalter – cello
 Dan Smith – cello
 John Mitchell – contra-alto clarinet
 David Campbell – orchestral conducting and arrangement
 David Reitzas – orchestral engineering
 Robert Conley – programming, recording (vocals)
 Nick Thomas – engineering
 Chris Lord-Alge – mixing
 Bob Ludwig – mastering

Charts and certifications

Weekly charts

Year-end charts

Certifications

Release history

References

2001 songs
2002 debut singles
Columbia Records singles
Darren Hayes songs
Music videos directed by Alek Keshishian
Number-one singles in New Zealand
Song recordings produced by Walter Afanasieff
Songs written by Darren Hayes
Songs written by Walter Afanasieff
Sony Music singles